Sirpur  is a village in Saraipali tehsil, Mahasamund district, Chhattisgarh, India.

References

Villages in Mahasamund district